Multicultural marketing (also known as ethnic marketing) is the practice of marketing to one or more audiences of a specific ethnicity—typically an ethnicity outside of a country's majority culture, which is sometimes called the "general market."  Typically, multicultural marketing takes advantage of the ethnic group's different cultural referents—such as language, traditions, celebrations, religion and any other concepts—to communicate to and persuade that audience. Cultural and Ethnic variation in multi-cultural societies such as the United States provides marketers with the opportunity to connect with consumers by developing consumer segments for targeted marketing initiatives.  For example, insight into to the culture and ethnicity of consumers is applied directly to consumer targeting through a variety of marketing initiatives in the U.S.

Cultural and Ethnic variation in multi-cultural societies such as the United States provides marketers with the opportunity to connect with consumers by developing consumer segments for targeted marketing initiatives.  For example, insight into to the culture and ethnicity of consumers is applied directly to consumer targeting through a variety of marketing initiatives in the U.S. Multicultural marketing acknowledges differences in perception, motives and beliefs among consumers with different cultural backgrounds, utilises cultural norms of several cultures to maximise exposure of the business's product or services by demonstrating interest and appreciation of different cultures (De-Mooij, 2015). For a multicultural marketing strategy to succeed, cultural differences must be identified, understood, and respected. Businesses must communicate on different "wavelengths" and adapt to different markets around the world (Wilkinson & Cheng, 1999).

International marketing generally works with national-level data (De-Mooij, 2015). International marketer analyses nations with respect to GNI/capita, education levels, available mass media, social media used, retail infrastructure and product category data, all at the national level (De-Mooij, 2015). Applying cultural values at the same national level is useful for understanding differences in consumer product ownership, brand preferences and motives. This cannot be established by differences in income or other demographic characteristics but may be explained by cultural differences (Demangeot, Broderick & Craig, 2015).

Cultural value data tends to be assessed using either primary or secondary data. Primary data is derived directly from assessing values through surveys or experiments. Secondary data includes scores of proportions of national culture. For individual-level studies, data is collected and analysed at the individual level and tied to the individual level outcome. For measuring culture at the national level, individual data are combined by country and linked to the country-level outcome or pre-existing country-level measures. (Demangeot et al., 2015)

Multicultural marketing (aka, ethnic marketing or cross-cultural marketing) applies unique marketing techniques to access the ethnic market. "Ethnic market" refers to cultures other than the majority culture in a company's home area. Multicultural marketing strategies involve recognising a culture's traditions, beliefs, values, norms, language, and religion—and applying those aspects to market to that culture's needs. (Rugimbana & Nwankwo, 2003).

History 
Multiculturalism was regarded as a problem, in Australia attempts were made to reduce cultural heterogeneity by restricting immigration to white Europeans (Wilkinson & Cheng, 1999). This idea was swiftly abandoned. Other issues included adapting to the customs and traditions of new countries, tensions between ethnic communities of historical origins (Wilkinson & Cheng, 1999).  Recently the focus has shifted onto the benefits of multiculturalism, and how it can potentially increase domestic and international brand recognition (De Mooij, 2015).

Economical, political, and social suggestions of this cultural mix cannot be ignored and has become widely recognised, for example the Australian Broadcasting Commission in 1995 took a significant step in ensuring that several cultures were taken into consideration and allowed for the best television programs to be sourced from around the world to cater to the needs of different cultural groups, airing programs from Asia and Europe, this directly influenced its ratings and achieved larger audiences (Wilkinson & Cheng, 1999). Various other types of products and services have been developed or adapted for the multicultural domestic market. For example, Chtaura Dairy products introduced Middle Eastern recipes for their dairy products.

Multi-cultural marketing did not increase in general society until the late 1960s where the potential of the ethnic market was first addressed. (Rugimbana & Nwankwo, 2003). Since then, multicultural marketing has slowly developed and the 1990s hit a peak when businesses began to recognize the value of targeting the ethnic market. Large companies such as Coca-Cola have invested in a multicultural marketing scheme, after realizing the potential of the ethnic market for the growth of their business. (Rugimbana & Nwankwo, 2003).

Multicultural markets
Two types of needs in a multicultural domestic market need to be considered. Firstly, the needs of people with different cultural backgrounds and secondly, the needs resulting from these values, perceptions, and preferences of cultural groups in the role products and services play in their lives (Demangeot et al., 2015).

Multicultural markets represent an important focal lens for international marketing and cross-cultural consumer research, in view of their growing economic importance and of their theoretical difference from other types of marketplaces. Changes in infrastructure, technology, economic development and consumer mobility have increased cultural interactions consequently an increase in multicultural market demand. Traditionally marketing research was based on static values; marketing is now viewed as more dynamic (Demangeot et al., 2015). Multicultural marketing is becoming a focal point of marketing research (De-Mooij, 2015).

Multicultural marketing strategy
Marketing strategy is centred around a goal of increasing sales and achieving a competitive advantage, marketing strategies can be short and long term (Kotler, Burton, Deans, Brown, & Armstrong, 2013).  Multicultural marketing strategies focus on adapting businesses value propositions to specific cultural groups to establish a multicultural target market (Demangeot et al., 2015). The marketing mix and the 4Ps (product, price, promotion and place (channels) play a role in establishing a marketing strategy (Kotler et al., 2013).

A marketing mix allows you to focus on goals and establish channels to communicate with the target market of the product or service. For a multicultural strategy to succeed, several factors must be addressed including creating a brand message that appeals to people of several different cultures and ethnicity using the available promotion channels that are touch points for the target market  (including television, social media, radio, and websites) (Burrell, 2015). To create a good multicultural marketing strategy, it is also important to work with individuals and agencies that understand the targeted consumer's lifestyles. Multicultural thinking must be incorporated into core overall brand strategy to respect cultures and build mutual trust. (Burrell, 2015)

Consumer purchases are influenced by cultural, social, personal and psychological influences (Kotler et al., 2013). These factors cannot be controlled but they can be accounted for while coming up with a marketing mix (Kotler et al., 2014). Culture is the base of a person's wants and behaviour. Growing up in society, a child learns basic values, perceptions, wants and behaviours from their family and other role models. Marketers decide to which degree they adapt their product and marketing programs to meet the unique cultures and needs of consumers in various markets

Promotion needs to be in the context of today's social and cultural differences. Companies can adapt to the same promo strategy to as the home market or adapt for each local market. The product, communication adoption involves modifying the message so that it fits with different cultural environments (Kotler et al., 2013). Product adaptation is changing the product to meet local needs, condition or wants or creating something new for the forging market is Product intervention (Kotler et al., 2013).

The reasons for multicultural advertising
The word “multicultural” is including people who have different customs and beliefs and multicultural consumer is any consumer who has two or more cultural or ethnic background or affiliation; in fact, they exhibit a contextual cultural identity that allows them to show different features of lifestyle, culture, etc. (the Wharton University of Pennsylvania, n.d). Therefore, marketers have to spot that they must develop their approach to account for this dynamic and fluid identity (Perez & Frank, 2011). While overall standards for a “good ad” are similar across group, cross-cultural customers actually need personal relevant to create ads more attractive to them.

In multicultural environments, the overall makeup of society is diverse, influencing the need for a multi-cultural approach to marketing strategies (Rugimbana & Nwankwo, 2003). The saying “one size fits all” no longer applies and strategies must be established to successfully communicate with all cultures through marketing techniques. ‘Culture’ has a large influence on marketing strategies as it affects communication channels, consumer behaviour and advertising standards and norms. (De-mooij, 2014) De-mooij also acknowledges that consumers are not the same worldwide, and their thought patterns and purchasing decisions differ depending usually on overall wealth of the country and other socio-economic factors (2014).

Adopting multicultural marketing strategies also allows businesses to gain a unique competitive advantage. It has been proven that consumers make purchasing decisions based on social, personal, cultural and physiological factors. (Kotler, Burton, Deans, Brown, & Armstrong, 2013). Once these factors are recognized and the marketer knows what factors entice a multicultural consumer to purchase, strategies can be executed to appeal to the market through their physiological needs.

Value of Multicultural Marketing
There are three main values of Multicultural Marketing (Rayo & Artieda, 2011). First of all is innovation – thanks for this type of marketing, the marketer and the companies have to be always creative to find a new solution, develop new products and marketing strategies. The second value of multicultural marketing is growth – which is the increase in sales and marketplace for the company's brand.  Finally, collaboration can be considered as the third value of cross-cultural marketing, which can bring people together and promote the brand and company.

Skills required
It is suggested that the following skills are required in the field of multicultural marketing.

 To spot patterns that allow subcultures to be grouped together, so that a common marketing strategy may be extended to several subcultures in a group (“transcultural” marketing)
 To develop a distinct marketing strategy for each subculture, if there is a significantly distinct cultural dimension that is important to the specific culture (multicultural marketing)
 To further segment audiences in a subculture, if needed, in terms of cultural affinity, cultural identity or acculturation level (tactical adaptation within a subculture)
 To develop parameters of culturally acceptable marketing stimuli; and
 To establish a protocol for measuring cultural effectiveness of the stimuli.

This process is also known as ethnic marketing.

Creating and refreshing a multicultural marketing strategy
Creating a multicultural marketing strategy

Multicultural marketing focuses on customizing messaging and marketing channels for each target group, as opposed to simply translating a general message into different languages, or including token representation of different ethnic groups in imagery (Stachura & Murphy, 2005).

A successful multicultural marketing strategy should be: multi-faceted, realistic and implemented consistently over time. In addition, there are 4 rules to make a cross-cultural marketing strategy: make your marketing bilingual – in world market in general and some large market in specific, most of the consumers are speaking more than one language, make sure digital marketing tactics match values and behavior, use entertainment and music as marketing tools, and develop cohesive content and programming (Wright, 2015).

There are 5 orders for a description of marketing strategy: detail specific activities that are intended to be undertaken, identify the target audience for each activity, specific how to measure success, be flexible enough for allowing adjustments, and finally, stipulate who is responsible for each activity (Klausner, 2013).

There are several steps to create a multicultural marketing strategy (Rayo & Artieda, 2011). The first step is to identify objectives and markets, and the target customer and their characteristics. Secondly, the strategy should identify potential consumer touch points like a comfort zone, language or tradition, culture, etc. The next step is to identify the media that makes sense for the marketing goals. Fourthly, the marketer must evaluate the approach and learn from others’ mistakes. Finally, the strategy must connect to the culture by understanding and respecting customers’ culture and tradition, building trust and connection with them in evocative ways, then making the company’ brand multicultural friendly.

Refreshing a multicultural marketing strategy

The fastest increasing population segment is multicultural audiences with expanding cultural beliefs that lead to the need of refreshing multicultural marketing strategy from companies to target products and services on this new growing population (Vachet, 2015). In 2013, Forbes presented 5 tips to refresh a cross-cultural marketing strategy, which are: socialize and mobilize – as the multicultural audiences is leading in social media usage and mobile technology, the marketer also must be socialized and mobilized; secondly, thinking multiculturally mean being multicultural is one of the biggest mistakes, actually, marketers do not have to be in a specific ethnicity to think as the above-mentioned community. The next tip is prioritizing the multicultural strategy which means the cross-cultural mind must be incorporated into the core strategy and the multicultural customer should be target in overall brand strategy. In addition, understanding all meanings of “multicultural” is considered as the fourth tip as marketers must reach all the potential customers. The final tip is trying new media platform and marketing vehicles or in other words, marketers have to try new media platforms and tools of marketing as the consumers have already done.

Pioneers
Pioneers in the field of multicultural marketing include Madam C. J. Walker, African-American businesswoman, hair care entrepreneur, Procter and Gamble, McDonald's, Pepsi cola and Benetton, and the entrepreneur Francesco Costa with My Own Media and ISI Holding in the foreigner services sector, Joseph Assaf with Ethnic Business Awards, Alan M. Powell CEO of AP & Associates, and Saad Saraf with Mediareach Advertising (UK).

See also
 Ethnic media
 EMMA
 Alternative media

References

 4 new rules for multicultural marketing
 Multicultural Marketing and the Changing Face of the Canadian Consumer: New Times-Call New Strategies

More reading

Burrell, Y. (2015). Branding your agency's multicultural marketing strategy. Public Relations Tactics, 22(6), 9.

Kotler, P., Burton, S., Deans, K., Brown, L., & Armstrong, G. (2013). Marketing (9th ed., pp. 5, 35–43, 296, 526). Australia: Pearson.
Wilkinson, I. F., & Cheng, C. (1999). Perspectives: Multicultural marketing in Australia. Journal of International Marketing, 7(3), 106–125.

External links
 https://web.archive.org/web/20120211093344/http://www.hispanicprblog.com/hispanic-organization-news/namic-announces-winners-of-the-2010-excellence-in-multi-cultural-marketing-awards.html
 

Marketing by target group
Multiculturalism